First Taste of Sin is the third album by the Oakland, California band Cold Blood.  This album is noted for being produced by soul singer/musician Donny Hathaway.  It also includes the original version of Hathaway's "Valdez in the Country", which Hathaway himself would record the next year for his 1973 album Extension of a Man.

Track listing
"Visions" (Donny Baldwin, Boroquez)  3:23 	
"Lo and Behold" (James Taylor)  4:12 	
"Down to the Bone" (Danny Hull, Cecil Stoltie)  5:45 	
"You Had To Know" (Donny Hathaway)  5:50 	
"My Lady Woman" (Danny Hull, Cecil Stoltie)  4:04 	
"No Way Home" (Danny Hull, Raul Matule)  3:25 	
"Inside Your Soul" (Max Haskett)  3:28 	
"All My Honey" (Danny Hull, Cecil Stoltie)  3:31 	
"Valdez in the Country" (Donny Hathaway)  3:44

Personnel
Lydia Pense - lead vocals
Sandy McKee - drums, vocals
Raul Matute - organ, piano
Rod Ellicott - bass
Michael Sasaki - guitar
Paul Beaver - Moog synthesizer
Mel Martin - flute, tenor and baritone saxophone
Danny Hull, Pete Christlieb - tenor saxophone
Bill Baker - alto and baritone saxophone
Gordon Messick, Pat O'Hara - trombone
Max Haskett - trumpet, vocals
Bill Atwood - trumpet
Ernest Diridoni - tuba
Donny Hathaway - piano, organ
Pete Escovedo - congas 
Coke Escovedo - tombales, percussion
Technical
Richard Moore - engineer
Wally Heider - recording
Marty Evans - cover photography

Charts

External links
 Cold Blood-First Taste of Sin at Discogs

References

1972 albums
Cold Blood (band) albums
Reprise Records albums
Albums produced by Donny Hathaway
Albums recorded at Wally Heider Studios